In professional wrestling, a feud is a staged rivalry between multiple wrestlers or groups of wrestlers. They are integrated into ongoing storylines, particularly in events which are televised. Feuds may last for months or even years or be resolved with implausible speed, perhaps during a single match. WWE's terminology discouraged the use of the term along with the word "war".

Definition
Feuds are often the result of the friction that is created between faces (the heroic figures) and heels (the malevolent, "evil" participants). Common causes of feuds are a purported slight or insult, although they can be based on many other things, including conflicting moral codes or simple professional one-upmanship such as the pursuit of a championship. Some of the more popular feuds with audiences involve pitting former allies, particularly tag team partners, against each other. Depending on how popular and entertaining the feud may be, it is usually common practice for a feud to continue on for weeks, usually building toward a match in a supercard.

One of the longest feuds of all time was the feud between Ric Flair and Ricky Steamboat, estimated by Flair to comprise more than 2,000 matches, though he admits that most of those matches were "confined to those in the arena."

Traditionally, most promoters wanted to "protect the business" by having wrestlers act in character in public, and thus further convince the live audience that the feuding wrestlers really did hate each other and were looking to outdo each other. During the days when wrestling territories were more regionally based, some feuds lasted for years, and if the feuding wrestlers were shown to really be friends, or were associating as friends in public, it would break the illusion of their feud, and undo all the work to promote it up to that point.

See also
Angle (professional wrestling)
Glossary of professional wrestling terms
Kayfabe
Shoot (professional wrestling)
Work (professional wrestling)

Notes

Professional wrestling slang